500s may refer to:
 The period from 500 to 599, almost synonymous with the 6th century (501–600).
 The period from 500 to 509, known as the 500s decade, almost synonymous with the 51st decade (501-510).